Hindenburg Research LLC is an investment research firm with a focus on activist short-selling founded by Nathan Anderson in 2017 and based in New York City. Named after the 1937 Hindenburg disaster, which they characterize as a human-made avoidable disaster, the firm generates public reports via its website that allege corporate fraud and malfeasance. Companies that have been the subjects of their reports include Adani Group, Nikola, Clover Health, Kandi, and Lordstown Motors. These reports also feature defenses of the practice of short-selling and how short-sells can "play a critical role in exposing fraud and protecting investors" in the company before publishing reports.

Operations
Hindenburg Research prepares its investigation report on a target company in six or more months by going through its public records and internal corporate documents, as well as talking to its employees. The report is then circulated to Hindenburg's limited partners, who, together with Hindenburg, take a short position in the target company. Hindenburg takes profits if the target company's share price declines.

Notable research

Nikola report 

In September 2020, Hindenburg Research published a report on the Nikola Corporation that included allegations of the company being "an intricate fraud built on dozens of lies" and argued that its founder, Trevor Milton, was responsible for much of the fraudulent activities. Following the release of the report, Nikola’s stock dropped by 40% and a Securities and Exchange Commission (SEC) inquiry was opened. While Milton initially disputed the allegations, he later resigned from his position as Executive Chairman and was eventually found guilty of wire and securities fraud. In November 2020, Nikola stated that they had "incurred significant expenses as a result of the regulatory and legal matters relating to the Hindenburg Report.”

Clover Health report and Chamath Palihapitiya 
Hindenburg released a report about Medicare Advantage plan Clover Health in February 2021, claiming that the company neglected to inform investors about it being under investigation by the Department of Justice. The report also argued that billionaire stock promoter and entrepreneur Chamath Palihapitiya neglected his due diligence and misled investors as he took the company public via special purpose acquisition company. Hindenburg disclosed that it has no short or long positions in Clover. Immediately following its publishing, Clover Health dismissed the accusations in the report and also stated it received a notice from the SEC.

Adani Group report 

In January 2023, Hindenburg revealed that it had short positions in India's Adani Group and flagged debt and accounting concerns. Concurrently, Hindenburg released a report claiming that Indian conglomerate Adani Group "has engaged in a brazen stock manipulation and accounting fraud scheme over the course of decades."  Soon after the report's release, Adani Group companies experienced an acute decline in their share prices. In a follow-up piece, The Guardian indicated that Hindenburg called on the Adani Group to sue if they believed the report was inaccurate.

Other efforts 
Hindenburg has also issued reports concerning the online betting operator DraftKings, the geothermal power plants company Ormat Technologies, electric car company Mullen Technologies, and a Chinese blockchain and cryptomining firm named SOS.

In October 2021, Hindenburg announced a $1 million reward for information on how the Tether cryptocurrency is actually pegged to the U.S. dollar, and for knowledge on Tether's deposits. Hindenburg included that, at the time, they did not own positions in any cryptocurrency.

In May 2022, Hindenburg took a short position in Twitter, Inc. following the announcement of its acquisition of Twitter by Elon Musk. After Musk's attempted termination of the deal, Hindenburg took a significant long position in Twitter betting against Musk on the acquisition to close.

See also 

 Muddy Waters Research

References

External links 

 
 Hindenburg Twitter

Short selling
Research and analysis firms of the United States
Privately held companies
Financial writers
Financial services companies established in 2017
2017 establishments in New York City
Financial services companies based in New York City